Hajar Dabbaghi Ashrafi Varnosfaderani (born 22 March 1999), known as Hajar Dabbaghi, is an Iranian footballer who plays as a forward for Kowsar Women Football League club Sepahan SC and the senior Iran women's national team.

International goals

References 

1999 births
Living people
Iranian women's footballers
Iran women's international footballers
Women's association football forwards
People from Isfahan Province
21st-century Iranian women